The Mercedes-Benz 300 SLR (W 196 S) is a two-seat sports racing car that took part in the 1955 World Sportscar Championship before a catastrophic crash and fire at Le Mans later that year ended its domination prematurely. The car was designated "SL-R" (for Sport Leicht-Rennen, eng: Sport Light-Racing), which was later condensed to "SLR". Technically, the W 196 S is based on the W 196 R, but has a slightly different engine, displacing 3 litres.

The W 196 S's monoposto driving position was modified to standard two-abreast seating, headlights were added, and a few other changes made to adapt a strictly track competitor to a 24-hour road/track sports racer.

Two of the nine 300 SLR rolling chassis produced (nicknamed the "Uhlenhaut coupé") were converted into 300 SLR/300 SL hybrids. Effectively road legal racers, they had coupé styling, gull-wing doors, and a footprint midway between the two models.

When Mercedes-Benz cancelled its racing programme after the Le Mans disaster, the hybrid project was shelved. Company design chief Rudolf Uhlenhaut, architect of both the 300 SLR racer and the hybrids, appropriated one of the leftover mules as his personal car. Capable of approaching , the Uhlenhaut Coupé was by far the fastest road car in the world in its day.

A 1955 Mercedes-Benz 300 SLR Uhlenhaut Coupé has become the most expensive car to ever be sold after being auctioned off for €135 million. The car, previously owned by Mercedes-Benz, was sold by RM Sotheby’s to an unknown collector at the Mercedes-Benz Museum on May 5, 2022.

History

Name
In spite of its name and strong resemblance to both the streamlined 1952 W194 Le Mans racer, and the iconic 1954 300SL Gullwing road car it spawned, 1955 300 SLR was not derived from either. Instead, it was based on the wildly successful 2.5-litre straight-eight-powered 1954–1955 Mercedes-Benz W196 Formula One champion, with the engine, enlarged to 3.0 litres for the sports car racing circuit and designated "SL-R" for Sport Leicht-Rennen (eng: Sport Light-Racing). All were the work of Daimler-Benz's design chief Rudolf Uhlenhaut.

Racing record

He was assisted by co-driver Denis Jenkinson, a British motor-racing journalist, who informed him with previously taken notes, ancestors to the pacenotes used in modern rallying. Teammate Juan Manuel Fangio was second in a sister car.

After missing the first two races at Buenos Aires in Argentina and the 12 Hours of Sebring in the United States, where Ferrari scored a victory and a second place respectively, the 300 SLRs later scored a decisive 1-2-3 finish in the Tourist Trophy at Dundrod, Ireland, and a 1-2 at the Targa Florio in Sicily, earning Mercedes victory in the 1955 World Sportscar Championship, two points ahead of Ferrari. Further non-championship trophies were also scored at the Eifelrennen in Germany and the Swedish Grand Prix.

Of the six races entered, the 300 SLR won five and was withdrawn from one: the car's impressive record was overshadowed at Le Mans, when the once again leading 300 SLRs were withdrawn after a horrific accident involving a team car driven by Pierre Levegh. Even with the innovative wind-brake, the car's drum brakes couldn't help prevent Levegh from rear-ending an Austin-Healey coming into his way, launching his car into the air. Upon impact, the ultra-lightweight Elektron bodywork's high magnesium content caused it to ignite and burn in the ensuing fuel fire. Compounding it, an uninformed race fire crew initially tried to extinguish the fire with water, only making it burn hotter. Eighty-three spectators and Levegh lost their lives in what remains the highest-fatality accident in the history of motorsport. Mercedes terminated its motorsport programme at the end of the 1955 season and would stay away from racing for the next three decades.

Uhlenhaut Coupé

Daimler-Benz made two road-legal 300 SLR coupés, known today as Uhlenhaut Coupé. One of these two cars once served as the personal car of its designer, Daimler-Benz motorsport chief Rudolf Uhlenhaut, hence the name.

Prior to the Le Mans accident he had ordered two of the nine W196 chassis built to be set aside for modification into an SLR/SL hybrid. The resulting coupé featured a significantly more sculpted body than the 300 SL fitted over a slightly widened version of the SLR's chassis, with signature 'gull-wing' doors still needed to clear its spaceframe's high sill beams. These were intended to race in the Carrera Panamericana which was cancelled because of safety concerns following the Le Mans disaster.

Before the project could be seen through, however, Mercedes announced a planned withdrawal from competitive motorsport at the end of 1955, in the works even before Le Mans. The hybrid program was abandoned, leaving Uhlenhaut to appropriate one of the leftover mules as a company car with only a large suitcase-sized muffler added to dampen its near-unsilenced exhaust pipes.

With a maximum speed approaching 290 km/h (180 mph), the 300 SLR Uhlenhaut Coupé easily earned the reputation of being the era's fastest road car. A story circulates that, running late for a meeting, Uhlenhaut roared up the autobahn from Munich to Stuttgart in just over an hour, a  journey that today takes two-and-a-half hours.

US auto enthusiast magazine Motor Trend road tested the car, as did two English journalists from Automobile Revue, who spent more than  behind its wheel. After a high-speed session at four o'clock in the morning on an empty section of autobahn outside Munich the latter wrote: "We are driving a car which barely takes a second to overtake the rest of the traffic and for which 120 mph on a quiet motorway is little more than walking pace. With its unflappable handling through corners, it treats the laws of centrifugal force with apparent disdain."

Their only regret was that "we will never be able to buy [the car], which the average driver would never buy anyway.".

One Uhlenhaut Coupé has been preserved by Mercedes-Benz and is displayed at its corporate museum in Bad Cannstatt. Its only sibling was sold from the museum in May 2022 to a private collector for €141 million euros or ₤138 million pounds or $142 million dollars with the proceeds used to establish the Mercedes-Benz Fund. The price was the highest ever paid for a car, either at private sale or public auction. It also surpassed the Ferrari 250 GTO at $75 Million (EUR 69 Million) the most expensive car ever sold before the Mercedes.

Technical description

Design
The 300 SLR was front mid-engined, with its long longitudinally-mounted engine placed just behind the front axle to better balance front/rear weight distribution.

The SLR had a second seat for a co-driver, mechanic, or navigator, depending on the race. As it turned out, this was only needed during the Mille Miglia, as the 1955 Carrera Panamericana was cancelled due to the 1955 Le Mans accident. On some circuits such as the Targa Florio the extra seat was covered and passenger windshield removed to improve aerodynamics. The front windshield for the two-seater mode was originally steeply raked, but due to intense turbulence in the cabin this was redesigned repeatedly during testing at Hockenheim before Mille Miglia. Jenkinson used the long curls of his trademark beard as flow visualization aids. Thus evaluated, the final design used at Mille Miglia ended up being near vertical.

A total of nine W 196 S chassis were built: seven roadsters, and two coupés. Work was ongoing on an updated design for 1956 when Mercedes-Benz abruptly announced their withdrawal from all forms of motorsport following the Le Mans tragedy. The front suspension, the engine, and the brakes were being redesigned for this cancelled project; in parallel with the Uhlenhaut Coupés a coupé version had also been under development, with the aim of once again winning the Carrera Panamericana.

Engine 

Like in the W 196 R, the engine was canted to the right at 53 degrees to lower the car's profile, resulting in slicker aerodynamics and a distinctive bulge on the passenger side of the hood shared with the streamlined Type Monza Formula one car. To reduce crankshaft torsion, power takeoff was from the centre of the engine via a gear rather than at the end of the crankshaft. Daimler-Benz fitted the engine with a single desmodromic intake valve, and a single desmodromic exhaust valve per cylinder, actuated by two spur-gear driven overhead camshafts. The fuel system is a direct fuel injection system with a mechanically driven eight-plunger inline injection pump made by Bosch. In addition to that, the W 196 S's engine was fitted with a dry-sump lubrication system and chromium-coated aluminium cylinder sleeves. For ignition, the engine was equipped with conventional double magnetos. Unlike the M 196 R engine, the M 196 S engine is designed to run on standardised, commercially available Super 98 RON petrol (DIN 51600).

Suspension system 

To enhance stopping power extra wide diameter drum brakes too large to fit inside 16" wheel rims were used, mounted inboard with short half shafts and two universal joints per wheel. Suspension was four-wheel independent. Torsion bars fitted inside the frame's tubes were used in the double wishbone front. To prevent cornering forces from raising the car, as occurs with short swing axles, the rear used a low-roll centre system featuring off-centred beams spanning from each hub to the opposite side of the chassis crossing one-another over the centreline. Nevertheless, snap-oversteer could be still a notable problem at speed.

At Le Mans in 1955, the 300 SLRs were also equipped with a large rear mounted "wind brake" that hinged up above the rear deck to slow the cars at the end of the fast straights. In tests the  light-alloy spoiler slowed the car dramatically and improved cornering, helping to compensate for the superior new disc brakes of the SLR's main rival Jaguar D-type.

SLR McLaren

Inspired by the 300 SLR Uhlenhaut Coupé, the Mercedes-Benz SLR McLaren grand tourer made its debut in 2003.   Jointly developed by Mercedes-Benz and McLaren Automotive it featured a hand-built 5.4-litre, supercharged  all-aluminium V8 engine.

The SLR McLaren was available in both coupé and roadster versions, as well as a number of other specialized variants.  Production ran through early 2010.

See also
 Mercedes-Benz W196
 Mercedes-Benz SLR McLaren
 Mercedes-Benz in motorsport
 List of Mercedes-Benz cars

References

Notes

Bibliography

  (includes the 300 SLR)
  
 
 
  (includes the 300 SLR)

External links

1955 World Sportscar Championship

300 SLR Uhlenhaut Coupe
300 SLR
Sports prototypes
24 Hours of Le Mans race cars
Mille Miglia
Rear-wheel-drive vehicles
Roadsters
Automobiles with gull-wing doors